Ralph Woodward Clanton (September 11, 1914 – December 29, 2002) was an American character actor of film, stage, and television. His most seen performance was Comte De Guiche in the 1950 film Cyrano de Bergerac, the first sound version in English of Edmond Rostand's play, and the film for which José Ferrer won his only Academy Award for Best Actor. Besides Ferrer as Cyrano, Clanton was the only holdover from the cast of the 1946 Broadway revival of the play, and would play the role of De Guiche opposite him once more, in a New York City Center production in 1953.

Career

After acting as the narrator in Canadian Pacific (1949), he was the American lead in the British war film They Were Not Divided.(1950).

Clanton was featured in seven episodes of Alfred Hitchcock's television show, as well as making several appearances on the Hallmark Hall of Fame. In 1976, he played the role of George Washington in a PBS television production of Sidney Kingsley's drama The Patriots. He also played Jasper Delaney on the TV soap operas, Another World and its spinoff Somerset.

He played Mr. Ingram in the sci-fi thriller The 27th Day.

He played guest star roles on numerous television series, such as four episodes of Perry Mason, including the role of Mervyn Aldritch in the premiere episode, "The Case of the Restless Redhead" in 1957, murder victim Charles Brewster in "The Case of the Fancy Figures" in 1958 and Karl Colby in "The Case of the Stand-in Sister" in 1962. In addition, he appeared on Broadway in the role of Claude Nau in Robert Bolt's Vivat! Vivat Regina!, as well as in several Shakespeare productions. One of his last roles was a bit part in the film Trading Places (1983).

In a playbill for the 1946 revival of Cyrano de Bergerac he is listed as a direct descendant of members of the infamous Clanton gang, which took part in the Gunfight at the O.K. Corral.

Partial filmography
Canadian Pacific (1949) - Opening Narrator (voice, uncredited)
They Were Not Divided (1950) - David Morgan
Cyrano de Bergerac (1950) - Antoine Comte de Guiche
San Antone (1953) - Narrator (uncredited)
New York Confidential (1955) - Narrator (uncredited)
The Vagabond King (1956) - Duke of Anjou (uncredited)
Hot Cars (1956) - Arthur Markel
Pharaoh's Curse (1957) - Col. Cross
Johnny Tremain (1957) - Gen. Gage
The 27th Day (1957) - Mr. Ingram
The Midnight Story (1957) - Trailer Narrator (voice, uncredited)
No Time to Be Young (1957) - Mr. Parner (uncredited)
Undersea Girl (1957) - Sam Marvin
The Absent Minded Professor (1961) - O.J. Turnbull (uncredited)
Panic in Year Zero! (1962) - Radio Announcer (voice, uncredited)
They Might Be Giants (1971) - Supermarket Manager
Trading Places (1983) - Official #1 (final film role)

References

External links

1914 births
2002 deaths
Male actors from Fresno, California
20th-century American male actors
American male film actors
American male stage actors
American male television actors
American soap opera actors